Jack Murchie (born 26 June 1997) is an Australian rugby league footballer who plays as a  forward for the Parramatta Eels in the NRL.

Murchie previously played for the Canberra Raiders and the New Zealand Warriors in the National Rugby League.

Background
Murchie was born in Batemans Bay, New South Wales, Australia.

His junior club was the Milton-Ulladulla Bulldogs.

Career
He represented the Australian under 23s rugby league team at the 2018 Rugby League Commonwealth Championship, where they defeated Tonga in the final 14-8 and were coached by former Queensland State of Origin and Papua New Guinea international, Adrian Lam.

2018
In round 19 of the 2018 NRL season, Murchie made his club debut for Canberra, played at the interchange bench in the controversial 24-28 loss to Cronulla-Sutherland Sharks at Southern Cross Group Stadium.

2019
Murchie only made one appearance for Canberra in the 2019 NRL season which came against Manly-Warringah in round 7.  Canberra would lose the match 24-20 at Brookvale Oval.

2020
On 21 May, Murchie was granted a release from Canberra Raiders to join the New Zealand Warriors on a one year deal. 9 days after joining the Warriors, Murchie made his New Zealand Warriors debut in round 3 of the 2020 NRL season against St. George Illawarra Dragons starting from the bench, in the 18–0 win.

2021-2022
Murchie eventually re-signed with the New Zealand Warriors until the end of the 2022 NRL season due to the successful run they had from late 2021 into 2022.  Murchie made a total of 14 appearances for the New Zealand club in 2022 as they finished 15th on the table.  On 6 September 2022, it was announced that Murchie had been released by the New Zealand side.
On 7 October 2022, Murchie signed with the Parramatta Eels on a two-year deal until the end of 2024.

2023
Murchie made his club debut for Parramatta in round 1 of the 2023 NRL season against Melbourne. Parramatta would lose 16-12 in golden point extra-time.

References

External links
New Zealand Warriors profile

1997 births
Living people
Australian rugby league players
Canberra Raiders players
New Zealand Warriors players
Parramatta Eels players
Rugby league second-rows
Rugby league players from New South Wales